The RS Tera is a one-man monohull dinghy in the RS Sailing range of sailing boats. It is recognised by the International Sailing Federation (ISAF) as an international class, and is a popular boat for beginners and for children to race.

Performance and design
The RS Tera is suitable for introducing newcomers to the sport of sailing, but is also a good boat to race. The boat is highly robust, and it is built with a self draining cockpit and is easy to right after a capsize, in addition to which it has a floating daggerboard. The boat is fairly small and light, meaning it is possible to transport on a roof rack, and that it is manageable on the water by younger children. The mast comes in two pieces, and the boom is padded.

Furthermore, the RS Tera can be rowed and has oarlocks. Built with a Comptec PE3 hull, the RS Tera has been described to have a modern look.

Features and Specification

The RS Tera is available in 2 specifications: RS Tera Sport and RS Tera Pro. The RS Tera Sport is designed with beginners and training centres in mind while the RS Tera Pro is more suitable to older, more experienced sailors. The weight range is between 30 kg and 70 kg and it can carry up to two children comfortably.

The RS Tera Sport has a reefable Dacron sail (the sail can be reefed to de-power in strong winds / for smaller children) while the RS Tera Pro has a battened Mylar sail which gives improved performance and an increase in power. There is also a Mini-sail for very small children, as young as 5 years old. All specifications fit on the same hull and same mast meaning that the same boat can be used for children of all ages and all abilities.

Hull: 
Constructed of rotor-moulded Polyethylene: Very strong and virtually maintenance free. 
Designed to be easy to handle with more finesse than rivals.
Wide comfortable side decks mean children feel safe sat on the side of the boat.
Light and easy to right after a capsize: Children do not need assistance to right and there are added righting lines to assist.
Self draining cockpit: Drains as it sails so that children do not need assistance.
Lightweight on a trolley for easy manoeuvring by children.

Rig:
All rigs fit on the same hull - more versatile and cost effective
Rig is far forward reducing the possibility of getting stuck "in irons" / head to wind
Boom is high and padded to prevent head injuries
2 piece mast for transporting and storage

Options
A rowing kit can be added for light wind fun
Racing pack is available for more advanced sailors

International Success, Awards and Recognition
The RS Tera gained International ISAF status in 2007.
The RS Tera is an RYA Recognised Junior Class.
The RS Tera is an ISAF Learn to Sail boat.

World championships

References

External links
 RS Sailing (Global HQ) - RS Tera supplier
 ISAF International Class - RS Tera
 RYA Recognised Class - RS Tera
 ISAF Connect to Sailing - RS Sailing

Class associations
 International RS Tera Class Association
 Australian RS Tera Class Association
 British RS Tera Class Association
 Danish RS Tera Class Association
 German RS Tera Class Association
 South African RS Tera Class Association
 North America RS Tera Class Association
 Czech RS Tera Class Association

Classes of World Sailing
Dinghies
2000s sailboat type designs
Sailboat type designs by Paul Handley
Sailboat types built by RS Sailing